The Great Southern Rail Trail is a 109-kilometre rail trail from Nyora to Welshpool in South Gippsland, Victoria, Australia. Sections of the trail are flat or gently undulating trail through lush dairy farmland, areas of remnant bush and lowland scrub. There is a big climb on the section between Loch and Leongatha. The section between Fish Creek and  Foster climbs past Mount Hoddle and goes through dense forest with occasional magnificent views of Wilsons Promontory and Corner Inlet.

The trail is well maintained with a surface of compacted gravel. Koalas, Wombats, wallabies and Echidnas can often be seen from the trail particularly in the early mornings and evenings.

The 10 km Toora to Welshpool section was opened on 7 February 2015. 

A section from Koonwarra to Minns road was opened in March 2016 incorporating what were three very dilapidated wooden trestle bridges. This section replaces what was a three kilometer diversion to the nearby South Gippsland Highway.  The section provides a continuous rail from Leongatha to Welshpool. Users can then link to a 6 km pathway to Port Welshpool and its picturesque Long Jetty. 

Two trestle bridges north of Loch were surfaced in late 2022 which completed the trail between Nyora and Loch, bringing the total trail length from Nyora to Welshpool to 107 km.

The trail is being progressively extended, and may eventually reach Port Albert and Yarram.

History 
The original South Gippsland line opened in 1892, joining Dandenong to Port Albert, with branch line to Woodside, Strzelecki, Outtrim and Wonthaggi. The railway was important for the settlement and development of the area, particularly providing transport for forestry and dairy products to Melbourne.

The line was closed to all rail traffic on 30 June 1992, a century after opening, when rail freight services to the Esso Mobil Barry Beach Marine Terminal, situated on Corner Inlet, ceased operation. Almost two weeks prior, on 17 June 1992, superphosphate rail freight services along the line to Buffalo ceased, which was the last 'mixed goods service' in the region and a distinctive feature of the line during its existence.

The line beyond Leongatha, to Yarram and Barry Beach, was dismantled in stages until 14 December 1994, when a V/Line 'rail recovery' train removed the last of the tracks, which were subsequently reused for the Melbourne to Adelaide railway line gauge standardisation project throughout 1995. The same day also saw the closure of the South Gippsland railway line from Nyora to Leongatha, but, two weeks later, that section of the line was reopened by the South Gippsland Railway tourist railway, which operated heritage rail services until December 2015.

The establishment of the South Gippsland Railway, and the electrification of the Cranbourne line in March 1995, thwarted the original plan by the Victorian state government to dismantle the entire line as far back as Cranbourne. The South Gippsland Railway formally ceased operations on 16 January 2016.

Rail trail route

Nyora to Leongatha via Korumburra
Construction of sections of the trail from Nyora to Leongatha are in progress in 2021.

The following sections were open as at November 2021:
 Trail through Leongatha
 Leongatha to Lows Road
 O’Neills Road to Korumburra
 Trail through Korumburra
 Bena to Loch
 Berrys Road to Nyora

In late 2022 two high trestle bridges north of Loch (over Allsop Creek and the Bass River) were surfaced which completed the trail between Nyora and Loch.

The section from Korumburra to Leongatha was completed in April 2022.

Leongatha to Koonwarra (8km) 
Leongatha is located in the foothills of South Gippsland's Strzelecki Ranges with a population around 5,000. The trail passes through wide-open spaces of lush dairy country before entering teatree and eucalypt bushland near Koonwarra.

Koonwarra to Minns Rd (3km) 
Incorporating a new section of trail covering three old wooden trestle bridges.  The path winds its way around hills and over river flats with wonderful views of the local area.

Minns Rd to Meeniyan (6km) 
This is a fairly rough section of the track, and there is an old timber bridge alongside the new bridge over the Tarwin River near Meeniyan.

Meeniyan to Foster, via Buffalo and Fish Creek (32km) 
 Meeniyan to Stony Creek (3.5 km)
 Stony Creek to Buffalo (8 km)
 Buffalo to Fish Creek (8 km)
 Fish Creek to Lowrys Rd (5 km)
 Lowrys Rd to Foster (7.5 km)
This section of the trail has a fine gravel surface and passes through bushland, swamp scrub and lowland forest. There is abundant local wildlife; kangaroos, wallabies and bird life thrive in this area. At the foothills of the Hoddle Range, there are steeper parts of the trail and a number of cuttings and embankments.

The quirky town of Fish Creek has a strong arts scene and plenty of options to eat and restock supplies. There is a climb from Fish Creek to Hoddle Summit where there are views over Corner Inlet and Wilsons Promontory from the peak.

Foster is a small regional town but caters well for visitors and there are plenty of accommodation options.

Foster to Welshpool (18km) 
 Foster to Charity Lane (1 km)
 Charity Lane to Toora (7 km)
 Toora to Welshpool (10 km)

Welshpool to Port Welshpool connecting trail (5 km)  
A trail connects Welshpool with Port Welshpool on the coast. The trail is initially an off-road bike path, then joins a quiet unsealed road which follows the alignment of the former horse-drawn Port Welshpool Tramway. Port Welshpool has views of Corner Inlet, Snake Island and the northern section of Wilsons Promontory National Park, and the Port Welshpool Long Jetty.

Welshpool to Alberton 
Funding for the extension of a section of the trail from Welshpool to Alberton was announced on 7 July 2021.

References

See also 
 Bicycle Trails in Victoria
 Rail Trails Australia description
Route map and trail guide available on Cyclewayz app
 Gippsland's official tourism website - Leongatha
 Gippsland's official tourism website - Foster
 Great Southern Rail Trail - Description and photos
 Bike Paths Victoria sixth edition, 2004. Edited and published by Sabey & Associates Pty Ltd. pp149. 
 

Rail trails in Victoria (Australia)
Leongatha, Victoria